Tokeh Also known as Tokeh Town is a coastal resort town along the peninsula in the Western Area Rural District of Sierra Leone. Tokeh lies approximately twenty miles east of Freetown and near the  neighborhood town of York. The major economic activity in Tokeh is fishing and tourism.

Tokeh is home to a large resort of sand beaches known collectively as Tokeh Beach, which attract a large number of tourists to the town . The Tokeh beach is one of the largest and most attractive beaches in West Africa. Tokeh is also known for its mountains, forests, resort hotels, and nearby Tokeh Island, an uninhabited island a short boat ride from Tokeh town.

Tokeh is a predominantly Muslim town, and its people are ethnically diverse among Krio. Temne, Loko, Sherbro, Mandingo, Limba, Mende and Fula. Tokeh is a principle home of the Krio Muslim people (locally known as Oku), who are politically influential in the town.

Although part of the Western Area Rural District, Tokeh has its own locally governed directly elected town council headed by a Town Head. The current Town Head of Loko is Alhaji James Slow, who was elected in the 2013 Tokeh Town Head Rural District municipal election .

History
The village of Tokeh was founded by a Sherbro fisherman named Pa Baw in the colonial era. Pa Baw settled along the river in Tokeh village.

In 1968 beach land was acquired by Mr. Shakib Basma, a prominent Barrister in Sierra Leone. He joined with a French company and they started developing Africana Tokey Village. This resort grew to 400 rooms and employed up to 600 staff at its peak. The '80s were the hay days of this beautiful resort. And it kept functioning to the mid '90s when facilities were shut down and tourists were told to stop coming. The resort was left abandoned during the terrible war in SierraLeone. Although rebels never destroyed any of the properties slowly the hotel was looted and destroyed.

In 2003 Issa Shakib Basma, son of shakib basma returned to Sierra Leone to revamp the properties and rebuild the resort.
Tokeh Beach Resort started in 2011 with Tokeh Sands, an 18-room resort with restaurant and bar. Tokeh Palms, a 16-suite resort, was completed in 2013, expansions and development are still in progress. The Basma family have helped develop Tokeh village since the '60s. The church, mosque, community centre & primary school are made on the land donated by Shakib Basma, expanding a village of approximately 80 people in the '60s to close to 6000 inhabitants today.

Opening of The Place
Tokeh Village got worldwide attention & recognition when an Australian business man Mr. Chris Brown who was also associated with London Mining opened his luxurious 5 star beach resort by the name of The Place in 2013 which was inaugurated by the President of Sierra Leone H.E Dr. Ernest Bai Koroma, (www.stayatheplace.com) is probably the only true 5 star resort in Sierra Leone. The Place resort under the guidance of Mr. Chris Brown build a dam which supplies water to The Place resort & Tokeh community, build a school worth US$40,000,which is known as the Kulafai school (near the junction & new site) supplied schools & hospital with furnitures & medicines as a part of Corporate Social Responsibility (CSR). Apart from that majority of employees work at The Place resort & regular training is conducted to engage youth & females from the community.

External links
http://www.ecosalone.com/Tokeh%20Sierra%20Leone.html

Populated places in Sierra Leone
Western Area